The SS Nurnberg was a 351-foot steamship that was also rigged for sail, built in 1874 by Robert Steele & Company, Yard No 80.

She carried passengers between Bremen and New York City, Bremen and Baltimore, then later between Bremen and Australia.

References

1873 ships
Ships built on the River Clyde
Ships of Norddeutscher Lloyd
Steamships of Germany